Gülpınar is a village in the Hassa District, Hatay Province, Turkey. The village had a population of 346 in 2022.

In late 19th century, German orientalist Martin Hartmann listed the village as a settlement of 14 to 17 houses inhabited by Turks and 1 house by Greeks.

References

Villages in Hassa District